Fly Hellas operated both scheduled and charter flights, serving the following destinations (as of May 2011):

Africa
Egypt
Cairo - Cairo International Airport

Asia
Israel
Tel Aviv - Ben Gurion International Airport

Europe
France
Lyon - Lyon Airport
Nantes - Nantes Atlantique Airport
Paris - Charles de Gaulle Airport
Greece
Athens - Athens International Airport Base
Samos - Samos International Airport
Skiathos - Skiathos Island National Airport
Thessaloniki – Thessaloniki Airport
Italy
Milan - Malpensa Airport
Portugal
Porto - Francisco de Sá Carneiro Airport
United Kingdom
Belfast – Belfast International Airport
Birmingham - Birmingham International Airport
Humberside - Humberside Airport
London
Gatwick Airport
Stansted Airport
Manchester - Manchester Airport

References 

Fly Hellas